Gimbert is a surname. Notable people with the surname include:

Ben Gimbert (1903–1976), English engine driver
Ghislain Gimbert (born 1985), French footballer
Philippe Gimbert (born 1966), French rugby union player
Sébastien Gimbert (born 1977), French motorcycle racer
Vanesa Gimbert (born 1980), Spanish footballer